A brüderschaft is a drinking ritual to consolidate friendship. Two people simultaneously drink a snifter each, with their arms intertwined at the elbows. Then, they kiss, sometimes on the mouth but nowadays usually on the cheek. While drinking, the participants should look each other in the eyes. Thence they are considered good friends and should address each other with the informal form of "you".

The ritual comes from medieval Europe, when it served as a proof of good intent of those gathered at table.

The expression "we didn't drink at a Brüderschaft" may be said by someone who thinks another is using too informal a tone (cheeky, impudent, vulgar) or, on the verge of insult, proposes to use a more formal tone.

References

External links
3 Russian Drinking Traditions You May Not Know About

Etiquette
Drinking culture
Traditions